NGC 311 is a lenticular galaxy in the constellation Pisces. It was discovered on September 18, 1828 by John Herschel.

References

External links
 

0311
18280918
Pisces (constellation)
Lenticular galaxies
Discoveries by John Herschel
003434